The following television stations operate on virtual channel 30 in the United States:

 K05NF-D in Salina, Utah
 K11IY-D in Battle Mountain, Nevada
 K11XI-D in Beaver etc., Utah
 K14LW-D in Myton, Utah
 K14RN-D in Scipio, Utah
 K16NK-D in Cave Junction, Oregon
 K17EZ-D in Rogue River, Oregon
 K17JD-D in Mount Pleasant, Utah
 K17NN-D in Leamington, Utah
 K18KO-D in Rural Summit County, Utah
 K19MC-D in Bonnerdale, Arkansas
 K20NP-D in Spring Glen, Utah
 K21NK-D in Cedar City, Utah
 K21OZ-D in Shreveport, Louisiana
 K22MP-D in Richfield, etc., Utah
 K23EX-D in Medford, Oregon
 K24IN-D in Green River, Utah
 K24ND-D in Orangeville, Utah
 K25CV-D in Hays, Kansas
 K25IM-D in Medford, Oregon
 K25JT-D in Blanding/Monticello, Utah
 K25NN-D in Nephi, Utah
 K25NO-D in Gasquet, California
 K26IK-D in Heber & Midway, Utah
 K26JB-D in Wells, Nevada
 K26KG-D in Beowawe, Nevada
 K26OF-D in Roosevelt, Utah
 K27KV-D in Evanston, Wyoming
 K27NP-D in Duchesne, Utah
 K27NQ-D in Helper, Utah
 K27NU-D in Green River, Utah
 K27NV-D in Scofield, Utah
 K27NW-D in East Price, Utah
 K27NY-D in Clear Creek, Utah
 K28PD-D in Delta, Oak City, Utah
 K28PE-D in Kanarraville, etc., Utah
 K28PF-D in Vernal, etc., Utah
 K28PG-D in Price, Utah
 K28PJ-D in Elko, Nevada
 K28PT-D in Manila, etc, Utah
 K29FY-D in Henefer/Echo, Utah
 K29IY-D in Ferron, Utah
 K29IZ-D in Huntington, Utah
 K29MF-D in Peoa and Oakley, Utah
 K29MY-D in Randolph, Utah
 K30AE-D in Alva, Oklahoma
 K30GC-D in Rural Beaver, etc., Utah
 K30GU-D in Morongo Valley, California
 K30HB-D in Agana, Guam
 K30HH-D in Memphis, Texas
 K30HJ-D in Cortez, etc., Colorado
 K30JT-D in La Pine, Oregon
 K30KE-D in Wanship, Utah
 K30KH-D in Emery, Utah
 K30LD-D in Wichita Falls, Texas
 K30MC-D in Lewiston, Idaho
 K30MM-D in Gila River Indian Community, Arizona
 K30MN-D in Barstow, California
 K30NY-D in Victorville, etc., California
 K30QV-D in Iowa, Louisiana
 K30QX-D in Duluth, Minnesota
 K30QY-D in Oakland, Minnesota
 K31FW-D in Lyman, Wyoming
 K31NH-D in Klamath Falls, Oregon
 K32IT-D in Coalville and Adjacent Area, Utah
 K32NE-D in Garrison, etc., Utah
 K33FY-D in Park City, Utah
 K33GJ-D in Merlin, Oregon
 K33HO-D in Soda Springs, Idaho
 K33NP-D in Russell, Kansas
 K33OZ-D in Parowan, Enoch, etc., Utah
 K33PC-D in Santa Clara, California
 K34GO-D in Fillmore, Utah
 K34HE-D in Elko, Nevada
 K34OU-D in Beryl, Modena, etc., Utah
 K36MI-D in Fountain Green, Utah
 K36OI-D in Manti/Ephraim, Utah
 K36OX-D in Samak, Utah
 K43MD-D in Blanding/Monticello, Utah
 K47GI-D in Grants Pass, Oregon
 K49IG-D in Yreka, California
 KAMK-LD in Eugene, Oregon
 KBAD-LD in Pago Pago, American Samoa
 KBLN-TV in Grants Pass, Oregon
 KCJO-LD in Saint Joseph, Missouri
 KDFS-CD in Santa Maria, California
 KDNL-TV in St. Louis, Missouri
 KEGS-LD in Las Vegas, Nevada
 KFOL-CD in Houma, Louisiana
 KFSN-TV in Fresno, California
 KGBD-LD in Great Bend, Kansas
 KHTX-LD in Huntsville, Texas
 KJUN-CD in Morgan City, Louisiana
 KKAF-LD in Fayetteville, Arkansas
 KKPD-LD in Tyler, Texas
 KKTF-LD in Chico, California
 KKYK-CD in Little Rock, Arkansas
 KMBB-LD in North Platte, Nebraska
 KPXN-TV in San Bernardino, California
 KQSY-LD in Corpus Christi, Texas
 KSMI-LD in Wichita, Kansas
 KTUZ-TV in Shawnee, Oklahoma
 KUCW in Ogden, Utah
 KUTA-LD in Ogden, Utah
 KWDA-LD in Dallas, Texas
 KWWT in Odessa, Texas
 KXJB-LD in Fargo, North Dakota
 W11DM-D in Collegedale, Tennessee
 W26EE-D in Wittenberg, Wisconsin
 W30BU-D in Green Bay, Wisconsin
 W30CV-D in Hilton Head Island, South Carolina
 W30DM-D in Manchester, etc., Vermont
 W30EI-D in Sharon, Pennsylvania
 W30EM-D in Ocala, Florida
 W30ES-D in Columbus, Mississippi
 W30ET-D in Flint, Michigan
 W30EZ-D in Purvis, Mississippi
 W30FA-D in Jasper, Florida
 WABE-TV in Atlanta, Georgia
 WAWW-LD in Rochester, New York
 WBUO-LD in Olean, New York
 WELW-LD in Evansville, Indiana
 WFDY-LD in Myrtle Beach, South Carolina
 WFOX-TV in Jacksonville, Florida
 WFWG-LD in Richmond, Virginia
 WGBC in Meridian, Mississippi
 WGCU in Fort Myers, Florida
 WGTE-TV in Toledo, Ohio
 WLFT-CD in Baton Rouge, Louisiana
 WLMT in Memphis, Tennessee
 WLPD-CD in Plano, Illinois
 WNSC-TV in Rock Hill, South Carolina
 WNVC in Fairfax, Virginia
 WNVT in Goldvein, Virginia
 WNYD-LD in New York, New York
 WQCW in Portsmouth, Ohio
 WRAY-TV in Wilson, North Carolina
 WRZH-LP in Red Lion-Harrisburg, Pennsylvania
 WWID-TV in Orlando, Florida
 WSDI-LD in Indianapolis, Indiana
 WSKA in Corning, New York
 WSVW-LD in Harrisonburg, Virginia
 WTAM-LD in Tampa, Florida
 WTIU in Bloomington, Indiana
 WUXP-TV in Nashville, Tennessee
 WVCY-TV in Milwaukee, Wisconsin
 WVCZ-LD in Valdosta, Georgia
 WVIT in New Britain, Connecticut
 WXVK-LD in Columbus, Georgia
 WZCD-LD in Cincinnati-Dayton, Ohio
 WZLH-LD in Syracuse, New York

The following television stations, which are no longer licensed, formerly operated on virtual channel 30:
 K22FC-D in Grants Pass, Oregon
 K26HS-D in Tillamook, Oregon
 K30KN-D in Wyola, Montana
 K30KR-D in Boise, Idaho
 K30MF-D in Jonesboro, Arkansas
 K30MY-D in Jackson, Wyoming
 K30QW-D in Geronimo, Oklahoma
 K44FH-D in Coos Bay, Oregon
 K45IA-D in Rock Springs, Wyoming

References

30 virtual